Orange Springs is a historic 52-acre home, farm complex, and former resort spa located near Unionville, Orange County, Virginia, just east of the intersection of US Route 522 and Route 629, located along Route 629, overlooking Terry's Run.

The two-story, "L"-plan frame residence on the property was originally constructed in the 1790s as a tavern.  It was converted shortly thereafter into a dining room and "dancing room" or ballroom for the spa complex. Orange Springs was in operation as a resort spa from the early 1790s until about 1850, after which the spa building was remodeled and enlarged for a family home.  It features a two-story front porch supported by chamfered wooden piers with vernacular Doric order capitals.  Also on the property are the contributing frame smokehouse topped with a pyramidal roof, dating from the period of the operation of the Orange Springs spa; a pit greenhouse; ice house; a granary, large barn, and cow shed built in 1916; and frame hen house (1908).

It was listed on the National Register of Historic Places in 1992.

References

Houses on the National Register of Historic Places in Virginia
Farms on the National Register of Historic Places in Virginia
Federal architecture in Virginia
Houses completed in 1790
Houses in Orange County, Virginia
National Register of Historic Places in Orange County, Virginia